Voksenkollen is a station on the Holmenkollen Line (Line 1) of the Oslo Metro. It is the penultimate station on the line, between Lillevann and Frognerseteren. The station was opened on 16 May 1916 when the line was extended from Besserud (then called Holmenkollen) to Frognerseteren.

The station is the one closest to the transmitting tower and tourist attraction Tryvannstårnet. Also near the station are a number of hotels and conference centres, including Soria Moria, where the Stoltenberg's Second Cabinet had their preliminary discussions in 2005.

References

External links

Oslo Metro stations in Oslo
Railway stations opened in 1916
1916 establishments in Norway